The 1869 Radnor Boroughs by-election was fought on 25 February 1869.  The by-election was fought due to the resignation of the incumbent MP of the Liberal Party, Richard Green-Price.  It was won by the Liberal candidate, Spencer Cavendish who was the Marquess of Hartington.

References

1869 elections in the United Kingdom
1869 in Wales
1860s elections in Wales
By-elections to the Parliament of the United Kingdom in Welsh constituencies
February 1869 events